Hon-Hergies is a commune in the Nord department in northern France.

History
The village of Hon existed in the 9th century and then became famous for the adulterous loves of Lothaire II, king of Lorraine, nephew of Charles-le-Chauve. In 862, Lothaire II, great-grandson of Charlemagne and king of Lotharingia, donated the stronghold of Canteraine to the abbey of Lobbes.
In 1678, by the Treaty of Nijmegen, Louis XIV obtained that all the villages of the provost of Bavay, until then included in the Spanish Netherlands, be attached to his kingdom.
In 1790, Hon and Hergies merged to become Hon-Hergies.

Heraldry

These arms are also those of the municipalities of Taisnières-sur-Hon and Moustier-en-Fagne. These three communes were possessions of the abbey of Lobbes from which they inherited the arms.

Economy
There are 7 Petit Granit quarries, 5 marble quarries, 5 lime kilns, 3 wheat mills, 1 oil mill, a marble sawmill and 3 breweries in Hon Hergies.

See also
Communes of the Nord department

References

Honhergies